Private Benjamin is a 1980 American comedy film directed by Howard Zieff, written by Nancy Meyers, Charles Shyer, and Harvey Miller, and starring Goldie Hawn, Eileen Brennan, and Armand Assante.

The film was one of the biggest box office hits of 1980, and also spawned a short-lived television series starring Lorna Patterson as Judy Benjamin, with Brennan reprising her role as Captain Lewis. Private Benjamin ranked No. 82 on the American Film Institute's 100 Years...100 Laughs list, and No. 59 on Bravo's list of "100 Funniest Movies".

Plot
Judy Benjamin, a 28-year-old Jewish woman from a sheltered wealthy upbringing whose lifelong dream is to "marry a professional man," is devastated after Yale Goodman, her new husband, dies on their wedding night during sex. Emotionally adrift, Judy tells her story on a radio call-in show and meets another caller, Army recruiter SFC James Ballard, who leads her to believe military life will provide the "family" she seeks. He also pitches the service as a getaway, comparing it to a spa vacation, but Judy has a rude awakening upon arriving at basic training, realizing the recruiter conned her. She wants to quit almost immediately, but is astonished to find out, contrary to the assertions of her recruiting sergeant, that she cannot leave.

Army regulations and the continual disapproval of both Captain Doreen Lewis and SFC L. C. Ross, the drill sergeant, frustrate Judy—but when her parents arrive at Fort Biloxi to take her home, berating her for "punishing" them with her decisions, she decides to stay and finish basic training. Judy does complete her training after a war games exercise in which her squad exposes an affair between a member of her training platoon and a rival company officer (with whom Lewis was also having an affair), and takes the leaders of both sides hostage. Upon completion of basic training, Judy and her friends spend the weekend on leave in New Orleans, where she meets Henri Tremont, a French doctor there for a medical conference. After a brief romance, Henri returns to Paris and Judy begins training with an elite paratrooper unit, the Thornbirds.

Judy quickly discovers she was chosen for paratrooper training because the unit's commander finds her attractive; after the other trainees have jumped from the plane, he attempts to sexually assault her. When Judy jumps out of the plane rather than comply, he attempts to have her transferred far from Biloxi as soon as possible. Rather than accept what she sees as an undesirable post in Greenland or Guam, Judy negotiates an assignment to Supreme Headquarters Allied Powers Europe in Belgium, and meets up with Henri again on a visit to Paris. He proposes marriage and she accepts, but when Captain Lewis discovers that Tremont is a communist, Judy is forced to choose between the Army and love.

After she chooses Henri and gets engaged, he reveals his childish, controlling nature. He tries to "remake" Judy, and also insists she sign a prenuptial agreement to protect his centuries-old family home. Finally, when Henri sleeps with the house maid and also makes it obvious that he has not gotten over his ex-girlfriend Clare, Judy has a change of heart. On her wedding day, in the middle of the ceremony, she realizes she is on the verge of a huge mistake. Judy abandons Henri at the altar and heads off into the unknown, empowered by her newfound freedom and excited about what may lie ahead.

Cast
 Goldie Hawn as Private Judith Benjamin
 Eileen Brennan as Captain Doreen Lewis
 Armand Assante as Henri Alan Tremont
 Robert Webber as Colonel Clay Thornbush
 Sam Wanamaker as Theodore Benjamin, Judy's father
 Barbara Barrie as Harriet Benjamin, Judy's mother
 Mary Kay Place as Private/2nd Lieutenant Mary Lou Glass
 Harry Dean Stanton as Sergeant First Class Jim Ballard
 Albert Brooks as Yale Goodman
 Richard Herd as Brigadier General Foley
 Toni Kalem as Private Gianelli
 Damita Jo Freeman as Private Gloria Moe
 Alston Ahern as Private P. J. Soyer
 Gretchen Wyler as Aunt Kissy
 Craig T. Nelson as Captain William Woodbridge
 Hal Williams as Drill Sergeant L. C. Ross
 P. J. Soles as Private Wanda Winter
 Wil Albert as Lieutenant Rahmi
 Denise Halma as Gabrielle
 Lee Wallace as Mr. Waxman
 Alan Oppenheimer as Rabbi
 Maxine Stuart as Aunt Betty
 Helen Baron, Paul Marin, and Mimi Maynard as the Lemish family
 Lillian Adams as Mrs. Goodman
 Alice Hirson as Mrs. Thornbush
 Sally Kirkland as Helga

Reception
The film holds a score of 83% on Rotten Tomatoes based on 35 reviews, with an average rating of 6.9/10. The site's consensus reads, "Private Benjamin proves a potent showcase for its Oscar-nominated star, with Goldie Hawn making the most of a story that rests almost completely on her daffily irresistible charm."

Roger Ebert gave the film 3 stars out of 4 and praised it as "an appealing, infectious comedy" in a review that concluded, "Goldie Hawn, who is a true comic actress, makes an original, appealing character out of Judy Benjamin, and so the movie feels alive, not just an exercise in gags and situations." Vincent Canby of The New York Times called Hawn "totally charming" and praised Zieff's "great skill at keeping the gags aloft and in finding new ways by which to free the laughs trapped inside old routines about latrine duty, war games, forced marches and calisthenics." Gene Siskel of the Chicago Tribune gave the film 3.5 stars out of 4, calling it "old-fashioned, commercial Hollywood filmmaking at its best — an upbeat, delightful comedy with a gentle message." Variety wrote that the film "is actually a double feature — one is a frequently funny tale of an innocent who is conned into joining the U.S. Army and her adventures therein; the other deals with the same innocent's personality problems as a Jewish princess with only an intermittent chuckle to help out." Charles Champlin of the Los Angeles Times panned the film, calling it "a movie you don't salute, you court martial. It may or may not violate the Articles of War but it raises holy hob with the laws of film making, the first of which is that you start with a good script." Gary Arnold of The Washington Post called it "a peculiarly unappealing throwback to the traditional service comedies like 'Buck Privates,' 'Caught in the Draft,' 'See Here, Private Hargrove,' et al.," with an "aimless screenplay" that leaves Hawn's character "less likable than the one at the beginning." Pauline Kael of The New Yorker wrote, "Goldie Hawn demonstrates what an accomplished comedienne she is—she carries 'Private Benjamin' on her back." David Ansen of Newsweek called the film "an uneven but highly enjoyable mixture of sociological satire, basic-training slapstick and feminist fable."

Box office
Private Benjamin grossed $4,739,769 from 763 theaters in its opening weekend, finishing at the top of the US box office. It added 36 more screens the following weekend and increased its gross to $4,935,571, finishing number one again, with a 10-day gross of $11.5 million.

Awards and nominations

The film is recognized by American Film Institute in these lists:
 2000: AFI's 100 Years...100 Laughs – #82
 2005: AFI's 100 Years...100 Movie Quotes:
 Pvt. Judy Benjamin: "I did join the Army, but I joined a different Army. I joined the one with the condos and the private rooms." – Nominated

Television series

In 1981, Private Benjamin was made into an Emmy and Golden Globe–winning television series of the same name that ran from 1981 to 1983. Set during the events of the film, it starred Lorna Patterson, Eileen Brennan, Hal Williams, Lisa Raggio, Wendie Jo Sperber and Joel Brooks. For the series, Brennan and Williams reprised their film roles, again portraying Captain Doreen Lewis and Sergeant L. C. Ross respectively.

Remake
In March 2010, Anna Faris was cast to portray Judy Benjamin in a Private Benjamin remake from New Line Cinema, but in May 2014, it was confirmed that Rebel Wilson would portray Benjamin in the remake. Amy Talkington was in discussion to write the script, which would update both the story and screenplay on which Harvey Miller, Nancy Meyers, and Charles Shyer had initially collaborated. Mark Gordon was set to produce.

The new adaptation Talkington was exploring would reset Miller's, Meyers', and Shyer's story in present day and set it against the backdrop of current military conflicts. According to insiders, the studio wanted neither to make fun of military service people nor take political potshots, but sought instead to focus on the empowerment elements and build upon the fish-out-of-water comedy. As of the beginning of August 2018, however, no new word was available on the project.

See also
 Never Wave at a WAC (1953)
 She's in the Army Now (1981 TV)
 Private Valentine: Blonde & Dangerous (2008)

References

External links

 
 
 

1980s English-language films
1980s American films
1980 comedy films
1980 films
1980s war comedy films
American feminist comedy films
American war comedy films
American political satire films
Films scored by Bill Conti
Films adapted into television shows
Films directed by Howard Zieff
Films with screenplays by Nancy Meyers
Films set in Mississippi
Films set in Belgium
Films about the United States Army
Jews and Judaism in fiction
Military humor in film
Warner Bros. films
English-language comedy films